In Greek mythology, Ekecheiria, Ekekheiria, or Ecechiria (Ancient Greek: Ἐκεχειρία means 'armistice, truce') was the spirit and personification of truce, armistice, and cessation of hostilities. The term is also used to refer to the Olympic truce. In Olympia there was a statue of her crowning her husband Iphitos of Elis.

Note

References 

 Pausanias, Description of Greece with an English Translation by W.H.S. Jones, Litt.D., and H.A. Ormerod, M.A., in 4 Volumes. Cambridge, MA, Harvard University Press; London, William Heinemann Ltd. 1918. . Online version at the Perseus Digital Library
 Pausanias, Graeciae Descriptio. 3 vols. Leipzig, Teubner. 1903.  Greek text available at the Perseus Digital Library.

Peace goddesses
Greek goddesses
Personifications in Greek mythology